Kabelo Mokoena (born ) is a South African rugby union player for the  in the Currie Cup. His regular position is wing.

He made his debut in the same fixture, coming on as a replacement.

References

South African rugby union players
2000 births
Living people
Rugby union wings
Blue Bulls players
Bulls (rugby union) players